Avital Boruchovsky (16 May 1997) is an Israeli chess player.

He was awarded the International Master title in 2012. In 2014, FIDE additionally awarded him the Grandmaster title, subject to achieving a 2500 Elo rating. His conditional qualification for the GM title resulted from the two norms that were gained at the 13th European Individual Championships (Bulgaria, 2014) and the 29th European Club Cup (Greece, 2013), where he scored 6.5/11 and 5/7 respectively. Boruchovsky's highest rating was 2565 (in September, 2017).

References

1997 births
Living people
Chess grandmasters
Israeli chess players